Kevin Sullivan (born March 20, 1974) is the men's head cross country and distance coach at University of Michigan and former middle distance runner from Canada. He was born in Brantford, Ontario.

Personal life
Sullivan studied civil engineering at the University of Michigan where he had 14 All-American honours and won 4 NCAA titles (one relay and 3 individual). Sulivan's father, Richard, is a machinist. He has two brothers, Darren and Colin. He played hockey and soccer while growing up in Brantford.  He was married to former Canadian steeplechase record holder Karen Harvey in 1998.  They divorced in November 2014.

Athletic career
Sullivan competed in 1000 metre, 1500 metre, and mile events and represented Canada. His personal best times are 3:31.71 for the 1500 (set in June 2000) and 3:50.36 for the mile. He is the former Canadian record-holder for the indoor 3000 m, 7:40.17 (set February 9, 2007).  His best Olympic showing is a fifth-place finish at Sydney. In 2005, he left his longtime Michigan coach, Ron Warhurst, to train under the coaching of Juli Henner. In the 2008 Summer Olympics, Sullivan reached the semi-finals of the 1500 metre but failed to qualify for the final. Sullivan was also a torchbearer for the 2010 Winter Olympics, carrying the torch into Brantford.

Sullivan was an assistant coach at Michigan in the early 2000s. He was a volunteer assistant coach at the University of Illinois at Urbana-Champaign and a coach at Florida State University.

Sullivan has been named one of the greatest Canadian distance runners of all time, concerning his placings in international competition, having competed at 3 Olympic Games, 22 World Championships (outdoors, indoors, and cross country), and still holding 4 Canadian track and field records including 3 outdoor and 1 indoor.

Personal bests

Coach
Sullivan is the men's distance & cross country head coach at University of Michigan. In his first year, the Michigan Wolverines qualified for the NCAA Division 1 Cross Country Championships under his leadership. Kevin took this position in 2014, after years of successful coaching at Florida State University where he assisted his wife coaching the women's distance team. Kevin also coached at University of Illinois at Urbana-Champaign.

See also
 Canadian records in track and field

References

External links
 

1974 births
Living people
Canadian male middle-distance runners
Canadian male steeplechase runners
Athletes (track and field) at the 2000 Summer Olympics
Athletes (track and field) at the 2004 Summer Olympics
Athletes (track and field) at the 2008 Summer Olympics
Canadian people of Irish descent
Michigan Wolverines men's track and field athletes
Michigan Wolverines track and field coaches
Olympic track and field athletes of Canada
Michigan Wolverines cross country coaches
Sportspeople from Brantford
Track and field athletes from Ontario
Commonwealth Games medallists in athletics
Commonwealth Games silver medallists for Canada
Goodwill Games medalists in athletics
Florida State Seminoles cross country coaches
Florida State Seminoles track and field coaches
Illinois Fighting Illini cross country coaches
Illinois Fighting Illini track and field coaches
Athletes (track and field) at the 1994 Commonwealth Games
Competitors at the 2001 Goodwill Games
Medallists at the 1994 Commonwealth Games